Syzygium anisosepalum is a species of plant in the family Myrtaceae. It is endemic to Peninsular Malaysia.

References

anisosepalum
Endemic flora of Peninsular Malaysia
Taxonomy articles created by Polbot
Taxobox binomials not recognized by IUCN